Farewell, My Beautiful Naples (Italian: Addio, mia bella Napoli!) is a 1917 Italian silent romance film directed by Giuseppe de Liguoro. It is based on a 1910 play, which was later turned into a 1946 sound film of the same name.

Cast
 Francesco Amodio
 Signor Castelli
 Irene-Saffo Momo
 Flora Severati
 Camillo Talamo
 Signora Tournier

References

Bibliography 
 Goble, Alan. The Complete Index to Literary Sources in Film. Walter de Gruyter, 1999.

External links 
 

1917 films
Italian romance films
Italian silent feature films
1910s romance films
1910s Italian-language films
Films directed by Giuseppe de Liguoro
Films set in Naples